is a cider project of the  club for protecting the old traditional orchards in the Black Forest of Germany and Dürr Fruchtsaefte Cider Company. The ciders are made only from these old orchards, which are widely spread on the countryside. The sweet cloudy flavor with a hint of bitterness reflects the flavor of these old apple varieties.

External links
 - Martinsmoos, Black Forest, Germany

Cider